Sphaericus is a genus of spider beetles in the family Ptinidae. There are more than 30 described species in Sphaericus.

Species
These 36 species belong to the genus Sphaericus:

 Sphaericus albopictus (Wollaston, 1854)
 Sphaericus ambiguus Wollaston, 1865
 Sphaericus ater Leiler, 1984
 Sphaericus bicolor Bélles, 1982
 Sphaericus crotchianus Wollaston, 1864
 Sphaericus dawsoni (Wollaston, 1854)
 Sphaericus erinaceus Erber, 2000
 Sphaericus exiguus (Boieldieu, 1854)
 Sphaericus flavosquamosus Erber, 2000
 Sphaericus fragilis (Wollaston, 1854)
 Sphaericus franzi Leiler, 1984
 Sphaericus gibbicollis Wollaston, 1862
 Sphaericus gibboides Boieldieu, 1854 (humped spider beetle)
 Sphaericus leileri Erber, 2000
 Sphaericus longicornis (Wollaston, 1854)
 Sphaericus machadoi Belles, 1994
 Sphaericus marmoratus Wollaston, 1865
 Sphaericus naviculiformis Erber, 2000
 Sphaericus nigrescens (Wollaston, 1857)
 Sphaericus niveus (Boieldieu, 1854)
 Sphaericus nodulus (Wollaston, 1854)
 Sphaericus obscurus Erber, 2000
 Sphaericus orbatus (Wollaston, 1854)
 Sphaericus orzolensis Leiler, 1984
 Sphaericus pilula (Wollaston, 1854)
 Sphaericus pinguis (Wollaston, 1854)
 Sphaericus ptinoides (Boieldieu, 1854)
 Sphaericus rotundatus Wollaston, 1865
 Sphaericus rotundicollis Israelson, 1980
 Sphaericus saetiger Erber, 2000
 Sphaericus selvagensis Bellés, 2001
 Sphaericus simplex Wollaston, 1862
 Sphaericus thurepalmi Leiler, 1984
 Sphaericus truncatus
 Sphaericus velhocabrali Israelson, 1984
 Sphaericus ventriculus Erber, 2000

References

Further reading

 
 
 

Bostrichoidea
Articles created by Qbugbot